Argyra may refer to:

Argyra, an insect genus
A plant genus currently considered a synonym of Croton
Argyra (mythology), a Greek nymph, one of the Naiads
Argyra, Greece, a village in Achaea, Greece
Argyra (Achaea), an ancient town of Achaea, Greece
Argyra (Euboea), an ancient city of Euboea, Greece
Argyra (Pontus), an ancient town of Pontus, now in Turkey